Mid Antrim was a UK Parliament constituency in Ireland which returned one Member of Parliament from 1885 to 1922, using the first past the post electoral system.

Boundaries and boundary changes
This county constituency comprised the central part of County Antrim, specifically the baronies of Glenarm Lower, Toome Lower, part of the barony of Antrim Lower (those parts in the parishes of Ahoghill, Ballyclug, Glenwhirry, Racavan and Skerry, and the townlands of Appletree, Ballee, Ballycowan, Carnaghts, Crevilly Valley, Cromkill, Slaght, Tullaghgarley and Tullynamullan in the parish of Connor), and that part of the barony of Antrim Upper in the parish of Ahoghill. It was bounded to the north by Antrim North, to the west by Londonderry South, to the south by Antrim South and Antrim East and to the east by the sea.

Prior to the 1885 United Kingdom general election and from the dissolution of Parliament in 1922 the area was part of the Antrim constituency.

In terms of the then local government areas the constituency in 1929 comprised parts of the Rural Districts of Ballymena, Ballymoney and Larne. The division also included the whole of the Urban District of Ballymena.

Politics
The constituency was a predominantly Unionist area. It was also a safe seat for the O'Neill family. All three of the MPs who represented the constituency were related. In 1918 the Unionists defeated Sinn Féin by about 4 to 1.

From 1886 to 1974 the Conservative and Unionist members of the United Kingdom House of Commons formed a single Parliamentary party.

The First Dáil
Sinn Féin contested the general election of 1918 on the platform that instead of taking up any seats they won in the United Kingdom Parliament, they would establish a revolutionary assembly in Dublin. In republican theory every MP elected in Ireland was a potential Deputy to this assembly. In practice only the Sinn Féin members accepted the offer.

The revolutionary First Dáil assembled on 21 January 1919 and last met on 10 May 1921. The First Dáil, according to a resolution passed on 10 May 1921, was formally dissolved on the assembling of the Second Dáil. This took place on 16 August 1921.

In 1921 Sinn Féin decided to use the UK authorised elections for the Northern Ireland House of Commons and the House of Commons of Southern Ireland as a poll for the Irish Republic's Second Dáil.  Elections to both assemblies were conducted not under the first past the post system, but instead under the Single Transferable Vote. Mid Antrim was incorporated in a seven-member constituency of Antrim.

Members of Parliament

Elections

Elections in the 1910s

Elections in the 1900s

Elections in the 1890s

Elections in the 1880s

See also
 List of Irish constituencies
 List of UK Parliament Constituencies in Ireland and Northern Ireland
 Redistribution of Seats (Ireland) Act 1918
 List of MPs elected in the 1918 United Kingdom general election
 List of Dáil Éireann constituencies in Ireland (historic)
 Members of the 1st Dáil

References

 Northern Ireland Parliamentary Election Results 1921–1972, compiled and edited by Sydney Elliott (Political Reference Publications 1973)

External links
 Oireachtas members database
 For the exact definition of Northern Ireland constituency boundaries see http://www.election.demon.co.uk/stormont/boundaries.html

Westminster constituencies in County Antrim (historic)
Dáil constituencies in Northern Ireland (historic)
Constituencies of the Parliament of the United Kingdom established in 1885
Constituencies of the Parliament of the United Kingdom disestablished in 1922